Aleksei Aleksandrovich Aravin (born 9 July 1986) is a Russian former professional footballer.

Career
He played his first game for the senior FC Lokomotiv Moscow team on 12 November 2005 in a Russian Cup matchup with FC Metallurg-Kuzbass Novokuznetsk.

He made his professional debut in the Russian Second Division in 2006 for FC SKA Rostov-on-Don.

He made his Russian Premier League debut for FC Sibir Novosibirsk on 14 March 2010 in a game against FC Terek Grozny. Later that year, he played in Sibir's Europa League campaign.

On 2 July 2014, Aravin signed a two-year contract with Anzhi Makhachkala.

References

1986 births
Sportspeople from Ulyanovsk
Living people
Russian footballers
Association football midfielders
FC Lokomotiv Moscow players
FC SKA Rostov-on-Don players
FC Sibir Novosibirsk players
Russian Premier League players
FC Volga Nizhny Novgorod players
PFC Spartak Nalchik players
FC Tom Tomsk players
FC Anzhi Makhachkala players
FC Tosno players
FC Luch Vladivostok players
FC Volga Ulyanovsk players